Jeremy Kipp Walker is an independent film producer and director.  His recent producing credits include the Oscar nominated films The Big Sick (Amazon Studios) starring Kumail Nanjiani and Half Nelson (THINKFilm) starring Ryan Gosling as well as Table 19 (Fox Searchlight Pictures) starring Anna Kendrick; Mississippi Grind (A24) starring Ben Mendelsohn and Ryan Reynolds; It's Kind of a Funny Story (Focus Features) starring Zach Galifianakis; Cold Souls (Samuel Goldwyn Films) starring Paul Giamatti; Ryan Fleck and Anna Boden's Dominican baseball odyssey Sugar (HBO Films); Moroccan-based thriller The Passage (THINKFilm) and the space thriller Europa Report (Magnolia Pictures).  Walker recently directed his first feature film The History of Future Folk (Variance Films), about the acoustic space duo Future Folk.  The Independent Spirit Award nominated film was co-directed with J. Anderson Mitchell with whom he previously directed the award-winning short films Super Powers and Goodnight Bill.  His physical production credits include the Oscar nominated film Maria Full of Grace as well as the HBO Films projects Everyday People and Angel Rodriguez.

References
 Press Kit for the 2008 film Sugar
 The New York Times

External links

Journeyman Pictures

Living people
Year of birth missing (living people)
American film directors
American film producers